Clenchiella is a genus of sea snails, marine gastropod molluscs in the family Clenchiellidae.

Species
 Clenchiella abatanriver Rubio & Rolán, 2020
 Clenchiella bicingulata Ponder, H. Fukuda & Hallan, 2014
 Clenchiella iriomotensis Ponder, H. Fukuda & Hallan, 2014
 Clenchiella minutissima (Wattebled, 1884)
 Clenchiella varicosa Ponder, H. Fukuda & Hallan, 2014
 Clenchiella victoriae Abbott, 1948
Species brought into synonymy
 Clenchiella papuensis van Benthem Jutting, 1963: synonym of Clenchiella minutissima (Wattebled, 1884)
 Clenchiella sentaniensis van Benthem Jutting, 1963: synonym of Coleglabra sentaniensis (van Benthem Jutting, 1963) (original combination)

References

External links

 Abbott, R. T. (1948). A new genus and species of Philippine Amnicolidae. The Nautilus. 61 (3): 75-80, pl. 5
 Ponder, W. F.; Fukuda, H.; Hallan, A. (2014). A review of the family Clenchiellidae (Mollusca: Caenogastropoda: Truncatelloidea). Zootaxa. 3872(2): 101

Clenchiellidae